Oleksandr Oleksandrovych Fedenko (born 20 December 1970) is a Ukrainian retired cyclist. He competed in four road and track events at the 1996 and 2000 Summer Olympics and won a silver medal in the 4000 m team pursuit in 2000. In this discipline his team finished in seventh place at the 1996 Games and won two world titles in 1998 and 2001.

In road racing, he won the Tour de Serbie in 1995.

Major results

Road

1995
 1st Overall Tour de Serbie
1996
 1st Stage 2 Tour de Beauce
 2nd Giro del Belvedere
1997
 1st Stage 3 Settimana Ciclistica Lombarda
1998
 1st Trofeo Adolfo Leoni
1999
 1st  Road race, National Road Championships
 5th Gran Premio della Liberazione
2000
 2nd Time trial, National Road Championships
2001
 3rd Poreč Trophy 4

Track
1997
 2nd  Team pursuit, UCI Track World Championships
1998
 1st  Team pursuit, UCI Track World Championships (with Alexander Symonenko, Sergiy Matveyev & Ruslan Pidgornyy)
2000
 2nd  Team pursuit, Summer Olympics (with Sergiy Chernyavsky, Alexander Symonenko & Sergiy Matveyev)
2001
 1st  Team pursuit, UCI Track World Championships (with Alexander Symonenko, Serhiy Cherniavskiy & Lyubomyr Polatayko)

References

1970 births
Living people
Ukrainian male cyclists
Olympic cyclists of Ukraine
Cyclists at the 1996 Summer Olympics
Cyclists at the 2000 Summer Olympics
Olympic medalists in cycling
Olympic silver medalists for Ukraine
Sportspeople from Kyiv
UCI Track Cycling World Champions (men)
Medalists at the 2000 Summer Olympics
Ukrainian track cyclists
21st-century Ukrainian people